Oliver Kirch (born 21 August 1982) is a  retired German footballer. Kirch played as a midfielder for BVB and was either deployed as defensive midfielder or right wing-back. In defense, he played as a right-back.

Club career 
Kirch started playing football at age five and was enrolled at the academy of SuS Legden in 1992; spending nine years as an academy player. Kirch would go on to join the academy of SuS Stadtlohn and then the academy of SpVgg Vreden. Kirch made his senior professional debut playing for SC Verl in the 2002–03 season before joining Borussia Mönchengladbach in the 2003–04 season, where Kirch made eight appearances in his first professional season. In the 2007–08 Bundesliga season, Kirch left Borussia Mönchengladbach and moved to Arminia Bielefeld and in his first match, he scored his first Bundesliga goal.

Kirch joined 1. FC Kaiserslautern in the 2010–11 Bundesliga season, where he signed a three-year contract. On 21 April 2012, during the 32nd matchday of the 2010–11 Bundesliga season, Kirch scored his first goal of the season in Kaiserslautern's 2–1 away victory over Hertha BSC.

Kirch joined Borussia Dortmund in the 2012–13 Bundesliga season. He signed a two-year contract with the German champions Borussia Dortmund until 30 June 2014. He scored his first Bundesliga goal for Borussia Dortmund on match day 32 in a 2–2 draw against Bayer 04 Leverkusen. Afterwards, Kirch joined SC Paderborn 07 in the 2015–16 season, he signed a two-year contract. In July 2016, Kirch decided to end his career.

Personal life
Kirch and fiancée Jana Flötotto were married in 2011; the civil marriage took place in December 2011 in Central Park in New York City, with the ecclesiastical taking place at the end of May 2012 at the Gütersloh Apostles Church in Gütersloh, North Rhine-Westphalia.

Career statistics

Club
.

Honours

Club
 Borussia Dortmund
DFL-Supercup: 2013, 2014
UEFA Champions League Runners-up: 2012–13

References

External links
 

1982 births
Living people
German footballers
Association football midfielders
SC Verl players
Borussia Mönchengladbach players
Borussia Mönchengladbach II players
Arminia Bielefeld players
1. FC Kaiserslautern players
Borussia Dortmund players
Borussia Dortmund II players
SC Paderborn 07 players
Bundesliga players
2. Bundesliga players
3. Liga players
SuS Stadtlohn players
People from Soest, Germany
Sportspeople from Arnsberg (region)
Footballers from North Rhine-Westphalia